Tarova is a rural locality (a village) in Stepanovskoye Rural Settlement, Kudymkarsky District, Perm Krai, Russia. The population was 497 as of 2010. There are 7 streets.

Geography 
Tarova is located 6 km southeast of Kudymkar (the district's administrative centre) by road. Artamonova is the nearest rural locality.

References 

Rural localities in Kudymkarsky District